Red Cross Hospital may refer to:

 Red Cross Hospital, Bancroft, Ontario, Canada

 Huashan Hospital, known as Chinese Red Cross General Hospital from 1907 to 1956, in Shanghai, China
 , in Germany
 Maingau Clinic of the Red Cross (est. 1890), in Frankfurt, Germany
 , a geriatric hospital in Germany
 Kaunas Red Cross Hospital, in Lithuania
 , in Lithuania
 , in the Netherlands
 , in the Netherlands, since 2004 part of Haga Hospital
 Red Cross War Memorial Children's Hospital, in Cape Town, South Africa
 Red Cross Hospital, in Stockholm, Sweden, now part of the Red Cross University College of Nursing
 Netley Red Cross Hospital, a wartime hospital on the grounds of the Netley Hospital (1856-1958), in Hampshire, United Kingdom
 Canadian Red Cross Memorial Hospital (1914-1985), in Taplow, United Kingdom
 Red Cross Hospital, in New York City, United States, now part of New York University Hospital at the New York University School of Medicine